Gustav Rehn (12 December 1914 – 18 March 1987) was a Norwegian footballer. He played in nine matches for the Norway national football team from 1945 to 1947.

References

External links
 

1914 births
1987 deaths
Norwegian footballers
Norway international footballers
Place of birth missing
Association footballers not categorized by position